The paleoflora of the Eocene Okanagan Highlands includes all plant and fungi fossils preserved in the Eocene Okanagan Highlands Lagerstätten.  The highlands are a series of Early Eocene geological formations which span an  transect of British Columbia, Canada and Washington state, United States and are known for the diverse and detailed plant fossils which represent an upland temperate ecosystem immediately after the Paleocene-Eocene thermal maximum, and before the increased cooling of the middle and late Eocene to Oligocene.  The fossiliferous deposits of the region were noted as early as 1873, with small amounts of systematic work happening in the 1880-90s on British Columbian sites, and 1920-30s for Washington sites. A returned focus and more detailed descriptive work on the Okanagan Highlands sites revived in the 1970's. The noted richness of agricultural plant families in Republic and Princeton floras resulted in the term "Eocene orchards" being used for the paleofloras.

Paleoflora 
The Eocene Okanagan Highlands hosted a diverse mix of temperate and tropical paleobiotic elements, with the forests having the first significant proportions of temperate plants in North America. The paleobotanical community was a mixture of plants found in subtropical evergreen and temperate deciduous forests.  Included in the forest were a number of important modern temperate flowering plant families such as Betulaceae, Rosaceae, and Sapindaceae, plus the conifer family Pinaceae. Study of the deciduous plants from the highlands has documented the occurrence of heteromorphic leaves derived from sun versus shade conditions and long shoot or short shoot buds.  The paleobotanical community of the Republic area has been noted as the most diverse floral community of the Okanagan highlands, with some estimates ranging to over 68 families and 134 genera being present.  The noted richness of Rosaceae fossils along with other important agricultural plant families found in the Republic and Princeton floras, including the genera that contain modern apples, blackberries, cherries, and serviceberries resulted in Wes Wher and Donald Hopkins (1994) coining the term "Eocene orchards".  Fossil evidence from both Sorbus/Crataegus and Rhus leaves in the Republic sites indicate the area was a center for species overlap and active hybridization events.

Extent 
The majority of the lake deposits are compression fossils in lake bed sediments grouped informally into "Northern", "Central", and "Southern" sites.  The Northern sites are comprised of unnamed Ootsa Group formations which outcrop as the "Driftwood shales" near Smithers, British Columbia, sites now considered lost in the Quesnel, British Columbia area, and the "Horsefly shales", of an unnamed formation and unnamed group which outcrop around Horsefly, British Columbia.  The Central sites represent Kamloops Group formations with the McAbee Fossil Beds, Tranquille River site and Falkland site, all in the Tranquille Formation, the Quichena site and Stump Lake site in the Coldwater Beds and outcrops of the Chu Chua Formation near Barriere, British Columbia.  The Southern sites include the Princeton Group Allenby Formation sites surrounding Princeton, British Columbia, such as "Nine Mile Creek", "One Mile Creek", "Pleasant Valley", "Thomas Ranch", "Vermilian Bluffs", and "Whipsaw Creek".  The most southerly of the Okanagan Highlands lakes, the Klondike Mountain Formation in Northern Ferry County, Washington include the "Boot Hill", "Corner Lot", "Gold Mountain", "Knob Hill", and "Mount Elizabeth" localities. Closely correlated with the Klondike Mountain Formation are the Penticton groups Kettle River, Marama and Marron Formations in the Boundary District along the Canada-United States border.

There is debate as to the affiliation of the, now lost, Quesnel outcrops with the Greater Okanagan Highlands.  Archibald et al (2018) in the monograph overview of the Highlands Hymenoptera included them as part of the series.  However the certainty for the placement was later questioned by Archibald and Cannings (2022) who opted to tentatively exclude Quesnel from the highlands while discussing the history of field collecting in the region.

Chert and amber 

Additionally two important non-compression biotas are present in the Eocene Okanagan Highlands.  A permineralized chert flora, the Princeton Chert is found along the Similkameen River interbedded with coal deposits of the Ashnola shale unit, Allenby Formation known for anatomically preserved plants.  In the Central sites, subbituminous coal of the Hat Creek Coal Formation around Hat Creek hosts an amber biota, the Hat Creek amber which preserves many small insects and plant fragments that would likely not be found in the compression biotas.

Diatoms 
Two algae taxa of the protist order Ochrophyta have been described from the highlands, and are placed in the family Aulacoseiraceae, a member of the diatom order Bacillariophyceae,.  The third algae is identified as a living paleoendemic Mallomonas species now restricted to warmer climates in North America and Europe.

Bryophytes 
A group of six mosses were described from the Allenby Formation by Kuc (1972,1974) representing the genera Ditrichites, Hypnites and Plagiopodopsis, with two species placed in the morphogenus Muscites.  Further revision of the fossils was conducted by Milner (1980), who placed two species into the genus Plagiopodopsis and moved both species described as Palaeohypnum to other genera. One further moss has been described from Horsefly, and placed in the living genus Aulacomnium by Janssens et al (1979). Dillhoff et al. (2013) reference undescribed moss specimens from the Klondike Mountain Formation known from vegetative gametophytes, and George Poinar, Jr. et al. (1999) illustrated an undescribed specimen of moss entombed in Hat Creek Amber.

Lycophytes 
Both an undescribed member of the fossil quillwort genus Isoetites and the spikemoss genus Selaginella  have been found in the Klondike Mountain Formation, while an additional fossil deemed Cf. Selaginella was later reported from the Allenby Formation.

Pteridophytes 
Four species of ferns and fern relatives have been described from the compression biotas and an additional four compression taxa that have been tentatively identified to family or genus.  A series of four additional ferns have been described from premineralized specimens in the Princeton Chert and a fifth taxon is identified to genus.

Gymnosperms 
Three major groups of gymnosperms are present in the Okanagan Highlands formations, with the most speciose being the pinophytes.  The ginkgophytes are represented by two species of Ginkgo, while an undescribed Zamiaceae member is the sole cycadophyte.

Cycadophytes

Gingkophytes

Conifers

Cupressaceae

Pinaceae

Sciadopityaceae

Taxaceae

Angiosperms

Nymphaeales 
The basal angiosperms are represented by two Nymphaeales water-lily species Nuphar carlquistii from the Republic and Princeton shales, plus Allenbya collinsonae from the Princeton Chert.  Wehr (1995) illustrated two fossils that were tentatively identified as fruits of the banana genus Ensete and the extinct myrtle genus Paleomyrtinaea respectively, however further fossil finds resulted in the re-identification of the first as a N. carlquistii rhizome section, and the second is a seed mass from the same water-lily.

Magnoliids

Monocots

Eudicots

"Basal eudicots"

"Superasterids"

"Superrosids"

Fabids

Malvids

Saxifragales and basal Superrosids

Incertae sedis

Fungi

Taxa of uncertain modern identification 
A number of taxa identified or described by Penhallow (1902, 1906, 1908) and Berry (1926) have not received much or any modern attention, resulting in uncertainty of taxon affiliation, identification, or synonymy. Many late 1800's to early 1900's identifications of Okanagan highlands fossils were made based on geologic age assumptions ranging between the Miocene to Pliocene, and often specimens were grouped into species bins for taxa first described from Europe.

References 

Geology of the Rocky Mountains
Paleogene geology of Washington (state)
Paleontology in Washington (state)
Ypresian North America
Paleontology in British Columbia